Adel Noori is a Uyghur refugee who was wrongly imprisoned for more than 7 years in the Guantanamo Bay detention camps in Cuba. His Guantanamo Internment Serial Number was 584.
Joint Task Force Guantanamo counter-terrorism analysts report that he was born on November 12, 1979, in Xinjiang, China.

Adel Noori is one of the 22 Uighurs held in Guantanamo for many years despite it becoming clear early on that they were innocent.

He won his habeas corpus in 2008. Judge Ricardo Urbina declared his detention as unlawful and ordered that he be set free in the United States.

Combatant Status Review

Noori was among the 60% of prisoners who participated in the tribunal hearings. A Summary of Evidence memo was prepared for the tribunal of each detainee.

Noori's memo accused him of the following:

Transcript

Noori chose to participate in his Combatant Status Review Tribunal.
On March 3, 2006, in response to a court order from Jed Rakoff, the Department of Defense published a single page Summarized transcript from his Combatant Status Review Tribunal.

Mohammon v. Bush, Civil Action No. 05-2386
Adel Noori was one of the petitioners in 
Mohammon v. Bush, Civil Action No. 05-2386.

In September 2007, the Department of Justice published dossiers of unclassified documents arising from the Combatant Status Review Tribunals of 179 captives.
The Department of Defense withheld Adel Noori's documents when they published the documents from the other 179 habeas petitioner's CSR Tribunals.

On July 18, 2008, George M. Clarke III informed the US District Court that:

Administrative Review Board 

Detainees whose Combatant Status Review Tribunal labeled them "enemy combatants" were scheduled for annual Administrative Review Board hearings.  These hearings were designed to assess the threat a detainee might pose if released or transferred, and whether there were other factors that warranted his continued detention.

Summary of Evidence memo
A Summary of Evidence memo was prepared for 
Adel Noori's 
Administrative Review Board, 
on July 1, 2005.
The memo listed factors for and against his continued detention.

The following primary factors favor continued detention

The following primary factors favor release or transfer

Board recommendations
In early September 2007, the Department of Defense released two heavily redacted memos, from his Board, to Gordon R. England, the Designated Civilian Official.
The Board's recommendation was unanimous
The Board's recommendation was redacted.
England authorized his transfer on October 22, 2005.

2005 through 2008
On June 12, 2008, the United States Supreme Court restored the Guantanamo captives' access to the USA's civilian justice system in its ruling on Boumediene v. Bush.
Specifically it re-initiated the captives' habeas corpus petitions.
In an unrelated development Huzaifa Parhat's DTA appeal concluded that his Combatant Status Review Tribunal had erred in confirming he was an "enemy combatant", due to insufficient evidence.
The Department of Justice had the option of appealing the ruling, claiming it had new evidence.  The Uyghurs' habeas petitions were the first to be scheduled for review.  
In September 2008, days before the Department of Justice would have been expected to offer a justification in court for the Uyghurs' detention, and after six and half years of extrajudicial detention, the Department of Justice acknowledged the evidence to justify their detention did not exist.

Temporary Asylum in Palau
In June 2009 the government of Palau announced that they would offer temporary asylum to some of the Uyghurs.
The government of Palau sent a delegation to Guantanamo, and interviewed some of the remaining Uyghurs.  
Some of the Uyghurs declined to be interviewed by the Palauans.  In the end the government of Palau offered asylum to twelve of the remaining thirteen Uyghurs. Palau declined to offer asylum to one of the Uyghurs who suffered from a mental disorder, brought on by detention, that was too profound to be treated in Palau.

On October 31, 2009, Adel Noori, Ahmad Tourson, Abdul Ghappar Abdul Rahman, Edham Mamet, Anwar Hassan, and Dawut Abdurehim were released and transferred to Palau.

Noori worked as a security guard at the Palau Community College.

Reappearance in Turkey

On February 14, 2013, the Associated Press reported that Noori had been "missing since late last year" from Palau.
The Uyghurs were not eligible for Palauan citizenship, so Noori had no legitimate travel documents.  The Associated Press quoted a report from Tia Belau, a local newspaper, that speculated Noori may have been trying to make his way to Turkey, to join his wife and child.

The Tia Belau reported that Noori had not been seen at work for two months.
They reported he had traveled through Japan, but Japanese officials could not refute or confirm this.

Carol Rosenberg, of the McClatchy News Services, confirmed on February 20, 2013, that US officials knew Noori had joined his wife in Turkey, though the officials she spoke with insisted on anonymity.
Joshua Keating of Foreign Policy magazine noted that "Noori's relocation is particularly impressive given that he is technically stateless and has no travel documents."

On June 29, 2015, Nathan Vanderklippe, reporting in The Globe and Mail, wrote that all the Uyghurs had quietly left Palau.
The Globe confirmed that Palau's agreement to give refuge to the Uyghurs was reached after the USA agreed to various secret payments.  Those payments included $93,333 to cover each Uyghurs living expenses.  The Globe confirmed that controversy still surrounded former President Johnson Toribiong who had used some of those funds to billet the Uyghurs in houses belonging to his relatives.

Vanderklippe reported that the men had never felt they could fit in with the Palauans.  
Some of the men compared Palau with a lusher, larger Guantanamo.  Some of the men were able to bring their wives to Palau.  Attempts to hold most regular jobs failed, due to cultural differences.  Attempts to use their traditional leather-working skills to be self-employed failed.  Eventually, all six men were employed as night-time security guards, a job that did not require interaction with Palauans.

One of the men's young toddler, born on Palau, died when he fell from a balcony.  
According to Vanderklippe, the men's departure from Palau was quietly arranged with the cooperation of American officials.  He reported they left, one or two at a time, on commercial flights.  Palauan officials would not share the Uyghurs' destinations.

References

External links

 Adel Noori's Guantanamo detainee assessment via Wikileaks
 From Guantánamo to the United States: The Story of the Wrongly Imprisoned Uighurs Andy Worthington October 9, 2008
 Judge Ricardo Urbina’s unclassified opinion (redacted version)
 MOTIONS/STATUS HEARING - UIGHURS CASES BEFORE THE HONORABLE RICARDO M. URBINA
 Palau Uyghurs try to build new lives Kyodo News December 15, 2009

Chinese extrajudicial prisoners of the United States
Uyghurs
Living people
1979 births
Guantanamo detainees known to have been released
Chinese refugees